The 1994 24 Hours of Le Mans was the 62nd Grand Prix of Endurance, and took place on 18 and 19 June 1994.

The 1994 race was won by a car that had its roots in a 10-year-old design. Porsche exploited an unusual quirk in the GT regulations at the time, using German fashion magnate Jochen Dauer in a plan to have a street-legal version of the dated Porsche 962 built.  Using this road car design, Porsche entered two converted 962 chassis in the GT category as Dauers.  With factory support, the Dauer 962 was able to take the win, the other 962 coming in a close third. Toyota, having themselves dusted off a pair of Group C chassis after its 3.5-litre engined TS010 was no longer eligible, suffered transmission problems with 90 minutes to go, leaving Eddie Irvine to finish 2nd in his 94C-V.

Regulations and entries
After the death of global Sports Car racing (aside from the IMSA series in North America), GT racing came to the fore. Knowing that teams would always want to race prototype sports cars at Le Mans, the Automobile Club de l'Ouest (ACO) came up with a pioneering equivalency formula to allow the production-based GT cars to compete for the outright win against its own LMP class and the IMSA WSC cars. These involved engine air-inlet restrictors, smaller fuel tanks and minimum weights to limit the prototypes' performance. The ACO also allowed the old 1990 Group C cars but they now had to be open-topped, with flat underfloors.

FISA's new GT rules had developed through 1993, aligning with the ACO, IMSA and Japanese JAF, defining a GT as a road-going car on sale to the public and registered for road-use in two of the following countries: France, Great Britain, Germany, USA or Japan. To allow time for entrants to prepare, the ACO was forced to issue its own GT regulations in September 1993, before FISA had completed their work.
A summary of the restrictions:
 LM-WSC:      fuel tank 80L,  target output 550 bhp,  min weight 900 kg (920 kg for turbos), max tyre width 16"
 LM P2:       fuel tank 80L,  target output 400 bhp,  min weight 620 kg, with production engines, max tyre width 12"
 LM GT1:      fuel tank 120L,  target output 650 bhp,  min weight 1000 kg,  max tyre width 14"
 LM GT2:      fuel tank 120L,  target output 450 bhp,  min weight 1050 kg,  max tyre width 12"
 IMSA GT-Supreme:  fuel tank 100L,  target output 650 bhp,  min weight 1000 kg,  max tyre width 16"

Minimum annual production levels were 25 for GT1, and 200 for GT2, however a crucial loophole in the rules allowed a manufacturer to apply for GT1 homologation even when still planning the car design and before any cars had been made, meaning a single prototype for a proposed model could be raced. Several manufacturers spot this exemption and would exploit it, most notably Porsche, whom managed to homologate the now decade old 962C.

Overall, interest was very high with the ACO receiving 83 applications, accepting 50 +reserves, to vie for the 48 starting places. 
From the aging Group C population there were only 8 LMP1 cars and 4 LMP2 entries. Toyota was backing two Japanese teams driving their new Toyota 94C-V. Roland Ratzenberger was originally scheduled to drive in the SARD Toyota but was tragically killed in qualifying for the San Marino Grand Prix.  Eddie Irvine took his place on the team, and Ratzenberger's name was left on the car in tribute.

Yves Courage, still trying emulate Jean Rondeau with an owner/racer Le Mans win, had three of his own cars, and the Kremer brothers had a new spyder in Gulf Racing livery. Roland Bassaler also took the chance to run his old 1982-vintage ALPA (rebadged Sehcar / née Sauber) one last time. Welter Racing again fielded two very fast little LMP2s. The two American WSC entries were later withdrawn, however there were three entrants for the IMSA GT-S silhouette category. These included the two Nissans from Clayton Cunningham's championship winning team that had earlier in the year won the Daytona and Sebring endurance races.

In GT, the two direct works entries were in GT2, with debutants Honda working with the Kremer brothers bringing three new NSX cars, and a pair of Lotus Esprit S300 entered by Hugh Chamberlain. The two Porsche 962 facsimiles were entered by Jochen Dauer and run by Joest Racing. All up there were 11 different marques represented in the GT field, including returns from Alpine-Renault, Bugatti, De Tomaso and Dodge. Ferrari was back in some force, as well as Reeves Callaway's new, modified Corvette.

Qualification
With the new LMP regulations trimming power, as well as reducing downforce by 50%, unsurprisingly the Group C cars struggled and were about 10 seconds slower than previously. Courage took confidence by gaining their first pole position, courtesy of former single-seat and Peugeot works driver Alain Ferté. Derek Bell was second-fastest in the Kremer spyder, then came the little WR from LMP2, of Patrick Gonin, punching well above its weight. But clutch problems prevented Marc Rostan from doing any qualifying laps so only Gonin and Petit were allowed to race. The Dauer 962s started 4th and 6th, on laps that were 20 seconds slower than a 962C's best lap, set by Oscar Larrauri in 1990, but 15 seconds faster than ADA Engineering's true LMP1 Porsche 962C.

The two Nissan 300SX in the GT-S category came in 9th and 12th amongst the rest of the LMP field, with the next fastest GT being the Ennea/Obermaier Racing Ferrari F40 starting in 14th, just ahead of the Jacadi Racing Venturi of ex-F1 racer Olivier Grouillard and Michel Ferté (Alain's younger brother). With the GTs mixing it up with the sports cars, it was looking like the ACO had got the equivalence formula about right.

Race

Start
Initially, Bell's Kremer took the lead, but was soon overtaken by Ferté's Courage, the local favourite. Ricci's Courage and Regout's WR collided first time through the Porsche curves. After also spinning on the first lap, Stuck got his Dauer-Porsche into the lead, and with their 50% bigger fuel tank (allowing an extra 2-3 laps) the two teammates, Stuck and Baldi, were soon running 1–2. After being initially strong, the Kremer and the Courages fell back, and both WR-Peugeots were having engine problems. So the pursuit was taken up by the two Toyotas. Danny Sullivan blew a tyre and spun his Dauer at the Ford chicane and, unable to get across to the pitlane, had to go all the way around again costing him 11 minutes. Eddie Irvine got his Toyota into the lead, but when he got held up with changing brake discs, the veteran Bob Wollek got the Nisso-Trust Toyota to the front as dusk fell. In GT, Anders Olofsson, the pro-driver in the Team Ennea Ferrari F40 was running in the top-10, just ahead of the Larbre Porsche 911 leading GT2, until electronics problems struck it.

Night
With the cooler evening temperatures, the Courages' tyres were far more effective and they came back into contention, with the Pescarolo/Ferté/Lagorce car getting up to 3rd by mid-evening. However, the second Courage retired with engine problems, and at 2am "Pesca's" Courage also succumbed. At 5am, the Nisso-Trust Toyota came into the pits from the lead with a severe vibration. It took nearly an hour to replace the differential, dropping it down to 5th. The SARD Toyota took over the lead, and had the pursuing Dauer-Porsche's covered. Thierry Boutsen had a scare during the night when his Dauer's headlights failed while doing 260 km/h approaching Tertre Rouge. Further delays dropped it 3 laps behind the leader.
With the demise of the Courages and the Kremer, it was the remaining Nissan 300SX of Millen/O'Connell/Morton that steadily moved up to 4th by dawn. One of the big surprises was the privateer Bugatti in GT1: driven hard by 1993 winner Éric Hélary with Alain Cudini and Jean-Christophe Boullion, catching and passing the Larbre Porsche and Callaway Corvette, and getting it up to 6th overall.

Morning
As morning broke, the SARD Toyota was still leading. The second Toyota was chasing the Nissan and finally overtook it for 4th at lunchtime when the latter had gearbox problems. Through the morning the unfortunate Bugatti needed all four of its turbos replaced. Dropping down the board, in the final hour, a tyre blowout pitched Bouillon into the barriers on the Mulsanne straight. Then, after leading for 9 hours and with only 90 minutes to go, Krosnoff came to a stop at the pit entrance without drive. He slammed it into 3rd gear and managed to get to his pitbox. Taking 13 minutes to repair a broken gear-linkage weld it dropped the Toyota to 3rd behind the two Dauer-Porsches, who were both now nursing fragile driveshafts themselves. Irvine got in and drove hard to catch up to Boutsen just 15 seconds ahead. He caught him with just 2 laps to go when Boutsen got held up behind back-markers. In turn, Boutsen fought to get back past, forestalling the usual parade-lap to the finish, but was unsuccessful.

Finish and post-race
The win gave Porsche its 13th victory, and for the drivers it was Haywood's 3rd, Dalmas' 2nd and the first for Mauro Baldi - who became the 100th different Le Mans winner.

For the second time in three years, Toyota had been pipped at the post. The thrilling battle of the leading three cars meant they finished 15 laps ahead of the second Toyota, itself 11 laps ahead of the GTS Nissan, and Derek Bell's Kremer after a race beset by niggly problems. The surviving Courage was fairly trouble-free and had been 7th for the last 6 hours, finishing over 450 km behind the leader. The first two GT2 cars home, in 8th and 9th, were Porsches from the Larbre and new Ecurie Biennoise teams - both had run like clockwork.

From the Le Mans success, Dauer Sportwagen subsequently sold a dozen 962 road cars.
Despite running into problems, all three Honda GTs finished, giving good heart to the Honda executives after their first foray to Le Mans.
This was also supposed to be Derek Bell's swansong Le Mans, driving the Porsche-powered Kremer. However, the lure of driving a McLaren F1 GTR with son Justin (who had run in the Dodge Viper this race) the following year proved too strong.

Official results

Statistics
 Pole Position - Alain Ferté, #2 Courage Compétition - 3:51.05
 Fastest Lap - Thierry Boutsen, #35 LeMans Porsche Team - 3:52.54, lap 243
 Winner's Distance - 
 Average Speed - 
 Highest Trap Speed — Dauer 962 Le Mans -  (practice)
 Attendance - 140000
 Last time when the team entered only two drivers for a racecar (Car #21)
 Callaway Sport was disqualified for getting pit service on the track and not in pit lane (Car #51)

Notes

References
 Spurring, Quentin (2014)    Le Mans 1990-99    Sherborne, Dorset: Evro Publishing  
 Laban, Brian (2001)    Le Mans 24 Hours    London: Virgin Books

External links

 Official website of the 24 Hours of Le Mans
 Racing Sports Cars – Le Mans 24 Hours 1994 entries, results, technical detail. Retrieved 4 July 2016.
 Racing Sports Cars – Le Mans 24 Hours 1994 (Photo Archive). Retrieved 4 July 2016.
 Le Mans History – Le Mans History, hour-by-hour (incl. pictures, YouTube links). Retrieved 4 July 2016.
 LXII Grand Prix d'Endurance les 24 Heures du Mans 1994, results & reserve entries, www.formula2.net, as archived at web.archive.org
 Motorsport Magazine – Motorsport Magazine archive. Retrieved 4 July 2016.

Le Mans
Le Mans
24 Hours of Le Mans races